Anento is a municipality located in the Campo de Daroca comarca, province of Zaragoza, Aragon, Spain. According to the 2004 census (INE), the municipality has a population of 198 inhabitants.

External links 
 Web Site of Anento

Municipalities in the Province of Zaragoza